Burgruine Glanegg is a castle in Carinthia, Austria. After Hochosterwitz and Fortress Landskron, is the third largest military complex in Carinthia.

History 
The history of the castle is first documented in 1121. The first owner was the Duke Henry III of Carinthia. After his death in 1122 it was inherited by his nephew, Count Bernhard von Marburg  and later Otakar III.   His son, Duke Ottokar IV left the castle after his death in 1192 to Leopold V. From 1473 to 1478 the castle was threatened by the Turks, but they failed to capture the castle. After three more owners, in 1534, King Ferdinand I owned the castle, but he had to sell it to Ulrich von Ernau because of his debts.

In 1818 by the castle was purchased by Hofrichter Hirzegger Ossiach, whose daughter, Josephine, married Klinze Glanegg, who was given the castle as a wedding present. In 1860 the castle was sold to Bregenz Mayor Ferdinand Kinz. After three more owners, the castle Glanegg finally came to a family of twins, which now own the castle.

Construction 
The building is composed of various architectural elements, ranging from Romanticism to Renaissance. What is striking is the entrance to the round tower. The decay of the castle began in the mid-19th century.

See also
List of castles in Austria

Castles in Carinthia (state)